The Boston College Eagles women's soccer team represent Boston College in the Atlantic Coast Conference (ACC) of NCAA Division I women's college soccer. The team has never won the ACC regular season championship, but has won the ECAC championship twice and shared the ACC  regular season title once. The team has advanced to the NCAA Women's soccer tournament 19 times, including one College Cup appearance.

History

1980s
The Boston College women's soccer program enjoyed a rather successful start to their history under coach Mike LaVigne.  LaVigne never lost more than 5 games during his tenure in the 1980s.  He took the team to their first two NCAA Tournaments in 1982 and 1983.  The team was also ranked in the top 10 in 1981–1984.  However, citing issues with then Athletic Director Mary Carson and the lack of a field for the 1983 NCAA Tournament, LaVigne resigned as head coach. Susan Kaplan was hired as the new head coach and coached the team through the end of the decade.  The team qualified for the NCAA tournament 2 times under Kaplan, in 1984 and 1985.  Kaplan also guided the team to double digit wins in 4 of her 6 seasons in charge.  The team won the ECAC championship in 1986 and 1988.  Kaplan left the program in 1989.

1990s
Terez Biancardi took over the program in 1990.  The first two years of her tenure proved difficult, with the Eagles winning 6 and 7 games during those years.  However, the next few years proved to be a return to form, with the team notching double digit wins in 1992–1994.  In 1993 the team moved to the Big East Conference.  This move was associated with Boston College becoming a full member of the conference.  The first years were fairly successful, with the team finishing runners up in the 1994 Big East Tournament.  However, their good run would not continue.  The team failed to make the NCAA and Conference tournament in 1995 and 1996.  After finishing both seasons with 9 wins, Biancardi would leave the program in 1996.  Alison Foley was hired as the next head coach.  The team won 12 games in 1998, her second season and 16 games in 1999.  The team returned to the NCAA Tournament in 1999, losing in the first round.  In 1999, Foley was awarded the NEWISA New England Coach of the Year Award.

2000s
Alison Foley continued to coach the team throughout the 2000s.  The team enjoyed success during the decade, never losing more than 10 games, and notching double digit wins in each season.  They made the NCAA Tournament 8 of the 10 years, and achieved their first quarterfinal appearance in 2009.  Boston College decided to leave the Big East and join the Atlantic Coast Conference (ACC) in 2003.  The move took 2 years to complete, and starting in 2005, the Eagles began ACC competition.  The team's last season in the Big East, 2004, proved one of their best, as they finished 7–3 in conference play and made the semifinals of the conference tournament.  The early years in the ACC were also positive, with the team finishing no lower than fifth in the conference between 2005 and 2010.  The team won a share of the regular season title in 2009.  The Eagles finished the decade strong, with their first and only College Cup appearance in 2010.

2010s
The Eagles continued to enjoy some success in the 2010s, qualifying for the NCAA tournament in 5 years and the ACC Tournament 6 years.  In 2014, they ended a streak of 11 straight NCAA appearances when they missed the tournament after a 10–8–1 season.  This was on the heels of a 2013 season where they made the NCAA Quarterfinals for the third time in program history.  Many of the Eagle's most famous players played for the team during this period, including Kristie Mewis who went on to play for the United States women's national soccer team.  From 2014 to 2017, the Eagles experienced a bit of a downturn, never finishing above seventh in the ACC, and only making the NCAA tournament once.  In 2017, they made the ACC tournament as the last invited team.  2018 was a turnaround year, where the team finished 14–4–1, qualifying for both the ACC tournament and the NCAA tournament.  They also won 10 straight games, tying a program record for most consecutive wins in a season.  After the season, Alison Foley resigned as coach after 22 years.  There were some questions over the reasoning behind her resignation, as the team had 22 winning seasons under her, and made the NCAA Tournament 15 times during her tenure.  Jason Lowe was hired as the new coach in January 2019. In Lowe's first year, the Eagles finished 14th in the ACC, their lowest ever.  Their 1–8–1 record was also the program's worst ever ACC record.

2020s 
The decade started with a season shortened by the COVID-19 pandemic.  The team played an ACC fall season and a non-conference spring season.  They finished 3–10–1 overall and did not qualify for the postseason.  The team played a  full 2021 season, finishing 7–10–1 overall and 1–9–0 in ACC play to finish in a tie for twelfth place.  This marked the third straight year where the Eagles won only one conference game, and their 7 overall wins were the lowest in a full season since 1991.  The team's fortunes did not improve in 2022, when they finished 5–8–5 overall and 1–7–2 in ACC play.  This was the fourth straight year, and every year in Lowe's tenure, where the Eagles won only one conference game.  The five overall wins were the lowest in a full season in program history.

Personnel

Current roster

Team management

Source:

Seasons

† In 1993 Boston College began play in the Big East Conference.
^ In 2005 Boston College began play in the Atlantic Coast Conference.

Notable alumni

Current Professional Players

 Kristie Mewis – (2009–2012) – Currently with Gotham FC
 Hayley Dowd – (2013–2016) – Currently with Djurgården
 Ashleigh Ward – (2013) – Currently with Southampton
 Allyson Swaby  – (2014–2017) – Currently with Angel City FC
 Sam Hiatt – (2016) – Currently with OL Reign
 Sam Coffey – (2017–2018) – Currently with Portland Thorns FC
 Rachel Newborough – (2018) – Currently with Charlton Athletic

References

External links
 
 Record Book (updated to 2017)

 
Soccer clubs in Massachusetts
NCAA Division I women's soccer teams
Association football clubs established in 1977
1977 establishments in Massachusetts